The Departmental Council of Seine-Maritime is the deliberative assembly of the Seine-Maritime department in the region of Normandy. It consists of 70 members (general councilors) from 35 cantons and its headquarters are in Rouen.

The President of the General Council is Bertrand Bellanger.

Vice-Presidents 
The President of the Departmental Council is assisted by 15 vice-presidents chosen from among the departmental advisers. Each of them has a delegation of authority.

References 

Seine-Maritime
Seine-Maritime